Evergreen International, Inc. was a 501(c)(3) non-profit organization located in Salt Lake City, Utah, the whose stated mission was to assist "people who want to diminish same-sex attractions and overcome homosexual behavior". It adhered to Christian and particularly LDS teaching and supported the doctrines of the Church of Jesus Christ of Latter-day Saints (LDS Church). The organization stated this task could be accomplished with the help of the Lord and, in some cases, psychological counseling. Evergreen was founded in 1989 as a grassroots organization by men who were seeking to deal with their homosexual feelings in ways congruent to the teachings of the LDS Church.

Teachings 

Evergreen stated that by using the atonement individuals could change, overcome, and transition away from the condition of homosexuality and homosexual sins, and they could diminish their attraction to those of the same sex. The organization also agreed with all teachings and policies of the LDS Church "without reservation or exception", but stated that it was not "affiliated with the Church". Evergreen also taught that "to be successful in diminishing erotic same-sex attractions and overcoming homosexual behavior, you must be willing to make a total commitment to the change process. It is our testimony that when you do all that you can and are willing to employ all the resources that are available to you, God's grace will make up the difference."

They published a map outlining the major areas people may have to address to diminish their same-sex attraction and successfully overcome homosexual behavior. It included the following elements:
Read books on same-sex attraction, masculinity/femininity, addictions, and related subjects from LDS authors, Christian authors, and professionals.
Personal prayer.
Develop a personal relationship with God and Jesus Christ.
Develop one-on-one, nurturing relationships with family, close friends, and acquaintances.
Provide service to others, both inside and outside Evergreen.
Experience activities as a bridge to the real world (for example, ski trips with men/women who don't experience SSA)."

General Authority Addresses 

General LDS church leaders spoke at nearly every Evergreen annual conference from 1996 to 2011.

 2000 – Elder Alexander B. Morrison of the First Quorum of the Seventy addressed members of Evergreen at their 10th annual conference which was held in the church's Joseph Smith Memorial Building and stated, "Avoid as the plague social interaction with persons who justify, encourage or engage in homosexual behavior. Stay away from places where those challenged by same-gender attraction congregate."
 2005 – At the 15th annual conference Elder James O. Mason of the Second Quorum of the Seventy directed, "Can individuals struggling with some same-gender attraction be cured? “With God, nothing should be impossible” (Luke 1:37) ... The right course of action remains the same: eliminate or diminish same-sex attraction." "Feelings of attraction toward someone of the same gender should be eliminated if possible or controlled."
 2007 – Church seventy Douglas Callister spoke at an Evergreen conference and urged listeners to battle their challenge of "same-gender inclinations" and thoughts through prayer, fasting, and taking the sacrament.
 2009 – Elder Bruce C. Hafen of the First Quorum of the Seventy gave an address at the 19th annual conference promising, "If you are faithful, on resurrection morning—and maybe even before then—you will rise with normal attractions for the opposite sex.  Some of you may wonder if that doctrine is too good to be true. But Elder Dallin H. Oaks has said it MUST be true, because 'there is no fullness of joy in the next life without a family unit, including a husband and wife, and posterity.' And 'men (and women) are that they might have joy.'"
 2010 – Keith B. McMullin of the Presiding Bishopric addressed the 20th annual conference and counseled that "If someone seeking your help says to you, 'I am homosexual' or 'I am lesbian' or 'I am gay,' correct this miscasting. Heavenly Father does not speak of His children this way, and neither should we. It is simply not true. To speak this way sows seeds of doubt and deceit about who we are. It belittles, depreciates, and disparages the individual." He further teaches that the "such limitations" as same-gender attraction won't exist after death, though "in and of itself it is neither evil nor sinful".

Therapy 

"Evergreen does not advocate any particular form of therapy" but did provide suggestions on how to choose a therapist and information on individual and group therapy. Evergreen stated that some people had lessened their same-sex attractions by using the following therapies: gender wholeness, reparative, reorientation, and re-education. The website referenced the works of Joseph Nicolosi who says reparative therapy can help people "explore the source of their problem, develop nonerotic same-sex relationships that diminish the sexual attraction they feel toward men, become more secure in their gender identity, and enjoy heterosexual relationships." The therapy is based on the view that homosexual attractions develop because of incomplete gender-identity development and defensive detachment from other males.

While some of these therapies offered to reduce same-sex attractions, Evergreen made clear that "therapy will likely not be a cure in the sense of erasing all homosexual feelings." Still, it would "strengthen masculine identification" for men. The LDS Church has stated that it does not have a position on "scientific questions" such as the cause of homosexuality. Evergreen followed this stance.

Association with NARTH 

The ' National Association for Research & Therapy of Homosexuality (NARTH), also known as the NARTH Institute, is an organization that (since 2014) functions under the Alliance for Therapeutic Choice and Scientific Integrity (ATCSI). It offers conversion therapy and other regimens that purport to change the sexual orientation of people with same-sex attraction. NARTH was founded in 1992 and has been described as "a multi-disciplinary professional and scientific organization dedicated to the service of persons who experience unwanted homosexual (same-sex) attractions (SSA)".

The Evergreen website referenced the therapeutic methods of NARTH founder Joseph Nicolosi as "beneficial". Nicolosi worked with A. Dean Byrd (an Evergreen Board member, Director of Clinical Training for LDS Social Services, and Brigham Young University professor) to author several papers on reparative therapy. Byrd also served as president of NARTH and also published an article in the LDS church's September 1999 Ensign. Additionally, David C. Pruden served as director of Evergreen and as an officer for NARTH. Likewise, Director of Family Services Jerry Harris served in NARTH leadership.

Effectiveness 
Participants in Evergreen programs claimed success in diminishing same-sex attractions and overcoming homosexual behavior.  As many as 40% of Evergreen members were in heterosexual marriages. Warren Throckmorton reviewed Understanding the meaning of change for married Latter-Day Saint men with histories of homosexual activity by J. W. Robinson. Robinson interviewed seven heterosexually married men who had been through Evergreen and previously identified as gay.  They believed that they had a spiritual transformation that changed their orientation. They also stated that they were no longer troubled by feeling different or rejected by heterosexual men, emotional attraction to men, sexual attraction to men, feeling bad about same-sex desires, social isolation, or compulsive sexual thoughts and behaviors. Robinson found that their change came from a new understanding that prior same-sex attractions did not require them to be gay.

Relations with the LDS Church 
Although it functioned independently of any church, Evergreen was religiously based on the teachings of the LDS Church. The organization adhered to its teachings "without reservation or exception." Evergreen had LDS general authorities on its board of trustees and taught LDS Church principles to Latter-day Saints and ecclesiastical leaders by coordinating with the Church as well as by hosting various events, such as firesides (informal evening gatherings of church members), workshops, and conferences. General LDS church leaders spoke at nearly every Evergreen annual meeting from 1996 to 2011.

Closure and transition to North Star
In January 2014, Evergreen International announced it would merge with North Star.

See also 

 Affirmation: Gay & Lesbian Mormons
 Criticism of Mormonism
 Ex-gay
 Homosexuality and The Church of Jesus Christ of Latter-day Saints
 Sexual orientation change efforts

References

External links
 Latter-day Saint (LDS) Resources About Same-sex Attraction, by Century Publishing at CenturyPubl.com, which includes an archive of LDS general authority addresses given at Evergreen conferences.

1989 establishments in Utah
2014 disestablishments in Utah
Charities based in Utah
Conversion therapy organizations
Defunct Latter Day Saint organizations
LGBT and Mormonism
Latter Day Saint movement in Utah
Christian organizations established in 1989
Religious organizations disestablished in 2014